One Tree Hill (sometimes also called Single Tree Hill) is a  mountain situated in the Nuwara Eliya District of Sri Lanka. It is the 10th highest mountain in Sri Lanka.

See also 
 List of mountains of Sri Lanka

References 

Mountains of Sri Lanka
Landforms of Nuwara Eliya District